Trysimia is a genus of longhorn beetles of the subfamily Lamiinae, containing the following species:

 Trysimia albomaculata (Schwarzer, 1924)
 Trysimia andamanica Breuning, 1948
 Trysimia geminata Pascoe, 1866
 Trysimia javanica Breuning, 1935
 Trysimia propinqua Breuning, 1959
 Trysimia rugicollis Pascoe, 1866

References

Lamiini